Ronald John McKeon (born 6 February 1961) is a former competition swimmer who represented Australia in the 1980 Summer Olympics and 1984 Summer Olympics.  He has three children, Kaitlin, Emma and David. Emma and David McKeon are current members of the Australian national swimming team in international competition.

See also
 List of Commonwealth Games medallists in swimming (men)

References

1961 births
Commonwealth Games bronze medallists for Australia
Commonwealth Games gold medallists for Australia
Commonwealth Games silver medallists for Australia
Living people
Australian male freestyle swimmers
Olympic swimmers of Australia
Swimmers at the 1978 Commonwealth Games
Swimmers at the 1980 Summer Olympics
Swimmers at the 1982 Commonwealth Games
Swimmers at the 1984 Summer Olympics
Commonwealth Games medallists in swimming
20th-century Australian people
21st-century Australian people
Medallists at the 1978 Commonwealth Games
Medallists at the 1982 Commonwealth Games